This is a list of people who have served as Vice-Admiral of Cornwall. This vice-admiralty jurisdiction was divided into North and South Cornwall between 1601 and 1715, with a separate vice-admiral for each; in addition, two members of the Godolphin family were vice-admirals of the Isles of Scilly between 1570 and 1638. The Vice-Admiral of Cornwall is an office of the Duchy of Cornwall, and is also sometimes referred to as the Lord High Admiral of Cornwall.

Vice-admirals of Cornwall (1559–1601)
 Edward Hastings, 1st Baron Hastings of Loughborough 1559
 William Lower 1559–1577
 Ambrose Digby bef. 1577–1578 (joint in 1577)
 John Arundell 1578–1582
 vacant
 John Killigrew 1587–1588
 Sir Francis Godolphin 1588
 John Killigrew 1588–1589
 vacant
 Thomas Payne 1590–1599
 Charles Trevanion 1599–1601

Vice-admirals of North Cornwall (1601–1715)
 William Roscarrock 1601–1621
 vacant
 Francis Bassett 1623–1645
 John Basset 1644–1645 (joint)
 Thomas Upton 1645
 John Trefusis 1645–1647 (Parliamentary)
 Edward Herle 1647–1649 (Parliamentary)
 vacant
 Richard Heyworth 1650–? (Parliamentary)
 John Basset 1660–1661
 Jonathan Trelawny 1661–1670
 Sir John Godolphin 1670–1679
 Sir Joseph Tredenham 1679–1686
 Sir John Molesworth, 2nd Baronet 1686–1715

Vice-admirals of South Cornwall (1601–1715)
 Hannibal Vyvyan 1601–1607
 Francis Vyvyan 1607–1608
 vacant
 Nicholas Burton 1612–1613
 vacant
 Sir James Bagg 1622–1638
 Sir Nicholas Slanning 1638–1643
 Sir Charles Trevanion 1643–1645 (Royalist)
 John St Aubyn 1644–1649 (Parliamentary)
 Anthony Rous 1649–1660 (Parliamentary)
 John St Aubyn  1660 (Parliamentary)
 Sir William Godolphin 1660–1663
 Francis Godolphin 1664-1671
 Sir Jonathan Trelawny, 2nd Baronet 1671–1675
 John Trelawny 1675–1682
 Sir Jonathan Trelawny, 3rd Baronet 1682–1693
 Henry Trelawny 1693–1702
 Charles Trelawny 1702–1710
 Sir John Trelawny, 4th Baronet 1710–1715

Vice-admirals of the Isles of Scilly (1570–1638)
 Francis Godolphin (senior) 1570–1606?
 vacant
 Francis Godolphin (junior) bef. 1630–1638

Vice-admirals of Cornwall (1715–1917)
 Sir John Trelawny, 4th Baronet 1715–1755
 Edward Boscawen 1755–1761
 Hugh Boscawen, 2nd Viscount Falmouth 1761–1782
 George Edgcumbe, 1st Earl of Mount Edgcumbe 1782–1795
 Richard Edgcumbe, 2nd Earl of Mount Edgcumbe 1795–1839
 Francis Seymour-Conway, 3rd Marquess of Hertford 1839-1842
 vacant
 William Edgcumbe, 4th Earl of Mount Edgcumbe 1897–1917

References

Institute of Historical Research

Military ranks of the United Kingdom
Vice-Admirals
Vice-Admirals
Cornwall
Military history of Cornwall
Vice-Admirals of the coast of the Royal Navy